Green jackets or Greenjackets may refer to:

Military formations:
 Rifle Brigade (Prince Consort's Own), a British skirmisher brigade formed in the Napoleonic Wars, colloquially known as the greenjackets due to the use of early camouflage
 Green Jackets Brigade, an administrative formation of the British Army from 1948 to 1968
 Royal Green Jackets, the modern descendant of the 95th Rifles

In sports:
 Green jacket, a prize awarded to the golfer who wins the Masters Tournament
 Augusta GreenJackets, a minor league baseball team based in Augusta, Georgia
 Green Jackets Ground, a cricket ground in St Cross, Winchester, Hampshire